Jim Langfelder (born January 16, 1960) is the mayor of Springfield, Illinois, the state capital and seat of Sangamon County. Prior to his election to Mayor of Springfield, he served as the city treasurer for three terms spanning from 2003 to 2015. Municipal offices in Illinois are legally nonpartisan, however, Langfelder is a member of the Democratic Party.

Early life
Langfelder was born in 1960 to Midge and Ossie Langfelder (who served as mayor from 1987 to 1995). He grew up in Springfield, one of thirteen children, attending both public and private schools. He went on to earn degrees at Lincoln Land Community College and the Sangamon State University. After college, he went into banking working in multiple roles at First of America Bank between 1988 and 1998 and later as business development officer at Security Bank.

Political career
Langfelder was elected City Treasurer in 2003 defeating former state legislator Gwenn Klingler.

In August 2014, Langfelder formally announced his candidacy for Mayor of Springfield joining a field that included incumbent mayor J. Michael Houston and Springfield Auditor Paul Palazzolo. During the campaign Langfelder campaigned on being a consensus mayor in a very political city with a platform that included a free wifi zone in the downtown area, targeted employment sectors, boosting redevelopment of old downtown buildings, a focus on renewable energy at the public utility, and assisting city council members in creating individual plans for their ward that could serve as part of the city plan and having at least one member of his cabinet be African American.

He won the February primary election in a five candidate field with 40% of the vote and won the April runoff election against Paul Palazzolo with 55% of the vote. During the election, he earned the endorsements of the Sangamon County Democratic Party, the Inner City Older Neighrborhoods organization, the State Journal-Register, and local labor unions including the Central Illinois Building and Construction Trades Council, the Central Illinois Trades and Labor Council and AFSCME Council 31.

In 2019, Langfelder was elected to a second term, defeating Republican Frank Edwards.

Langfelder is currently (2023) running for a third term as mayor, against Springfield city treasurer Misty Buscher.

Electoral history

References

21st-century American politicians
Illinois Democrats
Living people
Mayors of Springfield, Illinois
University of Illinois at Springfield alumni
1960 births